Rough Habit (2 December 1986 – 7 November 2014) was a New Zealand-bred Thoroughbred racehorse who won 11 Group One (G1) races on both sides of the Tasman, and won New Zealand's Horse of the Year Award in 1992 and 1995.

Background
Rough Habit, a bay gelding with a distinctive white blaze trailing over his near-side nostril, was foaled on 2 December 1986. He was sired by Roughcast (USA) out of Certain Habit (NZ) by Ashabit (GB). Certain Habit was the dam of 11 named foals that were produced in Australia and New Zealand, producing 2 stakes winners in Rough Habit and Citi Habit.

Racing record
Rough Habit was trained by John Wheeler, and had nine campaigns in Australia, from three to eight years of age. He won Group One races in Sydney and Melbourne and won six of his 11 Group One races at the Brisbane winter carnivals, where his wins included the Queensland Derby, two Stradbroke Handicaps, and a record three Doomben Cups.  Rough Habit won 21 feature races from 1,400 to 2,400 metres, on wet tracks and dry, and was narrowly beaten by fellow New Zealander Solvit in the 1994 Cox Plate.  Later in the season, Rough Habit won the O'Shea Stakes, in Brisbane, at his final start in Australia.

Honours
In retirement, Rough Habit appeared in a set of stamps issued by New Zealand Post in 1996 with fellow champion thoroughbreds Kiwi, Bonecrusher, and Horlicks, and the harness racing champions Blossom Lady and Il Vicolo.

In 2012, Rough Habit was inducted into the New Zealand Racing Hall of Fame at a special awards ceremony in Auckland.

The Brisbane Racing Club holds the Group 3 Rough Habit Plate for three-year-olds, which is run at set weights, and named in his honour.

Death
Rough Habit died on 7 November 2014, aged 28.

Pedigree

See also
 List of leading Thoroughbred racehorses
 List of millionaire racehorses in Australia
 Repeat winners of horse races
 Thoroughbred racing in New Zealand

References

External links
 "It's Rough Habit Time Again". Just Racing article

1986 racehorse births
2014 racehorse deaths
Thoroughbred family 1-h
Racehorses bred in New Zealand
Racehorses trained in New Zealand
New Zealand Racing Hall of Fame horses